Gymnobela lamyi is a species of sea snail, a marine gastropod mollusk in the family Raphitomidae.

The classification of this species in the genus Gymnobela is under consideration because the shell characters show a considerable divergence from those of the other species in the genus. Furthermore, no soft part are known.

Description

Distribution
This marine species occurs off the Azores at a depth of 1250 m.

References

 Dautzenberg P. (1925). Mollusques nouveaux provenant des croisières du Prince Albert Ier de Monaco. Bulletin de l'Institut Océanographique de Monaco 457: 1-12
 Gofas, S.; Le Renard, J.; Bouchet, P. (2001). Mollusca. in: Costello, M.J. et al. (eds), European Register of Marine Species: a check-list of the marine species in Europe and a bibliography of guides to their identification. Patrimoines Naturels. 50: 180-213.

External links
 

lamyi
Gastropods described in 1925